The Debt is a lost 1917 silent film drama directed by Frank Powell and starring Marjorie Rambeau.

Cast
Marjorie Rambeau as Countess Ann        
Henry Warwick as Count
T. Jerome Lawler as Baron Moreno
Paul Everton as John Slater
Nadia Gray as Ann's Daughter
Anne Sutherland as Slater's Mother
Agnes Ayres as The Girl
Robert Elliott

References

External links

1917 films
American silent feature films
Lost American films
Films directed by Frank Powell
1917 drama films
American black-and-white films
Silent American drama films
1917 lost films
Lost drama films
1910s American films